Jaclyn Symes is an Australian politician and Attorney-General of the state of Victoria. She is a Labor member of the Victorian Legislative Council, having represented Northern Victoria Region since 2014.

Symes worked for five years as a ministerial advisor for Rob Hulls, the Victorian Deputy Premier and Attorney-General. When the Labor Party lost government in 2010, Symes transferred to Hulls' electoral office. In 2011, she became pregnant and applied for maternity leave entitlements accrued during her employment with the Department of Premier and Cabinet, but was informed that as she was now employed by the Parliament of Victoria, she could not access the entitlement without dispensation from the Speaker of the Legislative Assembly. The Speaker, Ken Smith, declined the request, and the matter was referred to the Fair Work Commission by the Community and Public Sector Union. Premier Ted Baillieu intervened and referred the matter to the Public Sector Standards Commissioner to resolve any inconsistencies in the government's employment policies.

In November 2018, Symes was appointed as Minister for Agriculture, Minister for Regional Development and Minister for Resources. In March 2020, Symes became the Leader of the Government in the Legislative Council.

On 22 December 2020, Symes was appointed the new Attorney-General of Victoria, replacing Jill Hennessy, who had stepped down from the ministry to spend more time with her teenage daughters as they went through high school. In August 2021, Symes was appointed as Minister for Emergency Services but relinquished her resources portfolio.

Symes completed a Bachelor of Laws at Deakin University in 2002.

Symes is a member of the Australian Workers Union component of the Victorian Labor Right.

References

External links
 Parliamentary voting record of Jaclyn Symes at Victorian Parliament Tracker

Living people
Australian Labor Party members of the Parliament of Victoria
Members of the Victorian Legislative Council
21st-century Australian politicians
Women members of the Victorian Legislative Council
People from Benalla
Deakin University alumni
Attorneys-General of Victoria
21st-century Australian women politicians
Labor Right politicians
Victorian Ministers for Agriculture
Year of birth missing (living people)